The St. Louis Cardinals are a Major League Baseball franchise based in St. Louis Missouri. They play in the National League Central division. Also known in their early years as the "St. Louis Brown Stockings" (1882), "St. Louis Browns" (1883–1898), and "St. Louis Perfectos" (1899), pitchers for the Cardinals have thrown 10 no-hitters in franchise history. A no-hitter is officially recognized by Major League Baseball only "when a pitcher (or pitchers) allows no hits during the entire course of a game, which consists of at least nine innings", though one or more batters "may reach base via a walk, an error, a hit by pitch, a passed ball or wild pitch on strike three, or catcher's interference". No-hitters of less than nine complete innings were previously recognized by the league as official; however, several rule alterations in 1991 changed the rule to its current form. A perfect game, a special subcategory of no-hitter, has yet to be thrown in Cardinals history. As defined by Major League Baseball, "in a perfect game, no batter reaches any base during the course of the game."

Ted Breitenstein threw the first no-hitter in Cardinals franchise history on his first major league start on October 4, 1891 when the team was known as the "St. Louis Browns"; the most recent no-hitter was thrown by Bud Smith on September 3, 2001.

Two left-handed pitchers have thrown no-hitters in franchise history, while seven were by right-handers. Four no-hitters were thrown at home and six on the road, whilst all ten have been pitched against different opponents. The Cardinals have thrown one no-hitter in April, one in June, one in July, two in August, four in September, and one in October. The longest interval between no-hitters was between the games pitched by Breitenstein and Jesse Haines, encompassing 32 years, 9 months, and 13 days from October 4, 1891 till August 17, 1924. Conversely, the shortest interval between no-hitters was between the games pitched by Jiménez and Smith, encompassing merely 2 years, 2 months, and 9 days from June 25, 1999 till September 3, 2001.

In none of their ten no-hitters did the Cardinals allow any runs via errors, walks, hit batters or uncaught third strikes. The most baserunners allowed in a no-hitter was by Ray Washburn (in 1968), who allowed five. Of the ten no-hitters, two have been won by a score of 2–0, 3–0, and 5–0, more common than any other results. The largest margin of victory in a no-hitter was an 11–0 win by Bob Gibson in 1971. The smallest margin of victory was a 1–0 win by Jiménez in 2001.

The umpire is also an integral part of any no-hitter. The task of the umpire in a baseball game is to make any decision "which involves judgment, such as, but not limited to, whether a batted ball is fair or foul, whether a pitch is a strike or a ball, or whether a runner is safe or out… [the umpire's judgment on such matters] is final." Part of the duties of the umpire making calls at home plate includes defining the strike zone, which "is defined as that area over homeplate (sic) the upper limit of which is a horizontal line at the midpoint between the top of the shoulders and the top of the uniform pants, and the lower level is a line at the hollow beneath the kneecap." These calls define every baseball game and are therefore integral to the completion of any no-hitter. Eight different umpires presided over each of the franchise's ten no-hitters.

The manager is another integral part of any no-hitter. The tasks of the manager is to determine the starting rotation as well as batting order and defensive lineup every game. Managers choosing the right pitcher and right defensive lineup at a right game at a right place at a right time would contribute to a no-hitter. Eight different managers have led to the franchise's ten no-hitters.

List of no-hitters in Cardinals history

See also
List of Major League Baseball no-hitters

References

No-hitters
St. Louis Cardinals